Return to Paradise is a 2022 Philippine television drama romance series broadcast by GMA Network. Directed by Don Michael Perez, it stars Derrick Monasterio and Elle Villanueva. It premiered on August 1, 2022 on the network's Afternoon Prime line up replacing Raising Mamay. The series concluded on November 4, 2022 with a total of 70 episodes. It was replaced by Unica Hija in its timeslot.

The series is streaming online on YouTube.

Cast and characters

Lead cast
 Derrick Monasterio as Red Ramos
 Elle Villanueva as Eden "Yenyen" Sta. Maria 

Supporting cast
 Eula Valdez as Amanda Sta. Maria / Mrs. Madrigal
 Teresa Loyzaga as Rina Ramos
 Allen Dizon as Lucho Madrigal
 Ricardo Cepeda as Victor Ramos
 Karel Marquez as Dindi Sta. Maria
 Liezel Lopez as Sabina
  Kiray Celis as Raichu
 Paolo Paraiso as Zandro
 Mia Pangyarihan as Coach Vinluan

Episodes

References

External links
 
 

2022 Philippine television series debuts
2022 Philippine television series endings
Filipino-language television shows
GMA Network drama series
Philippine romance television series
Television shows set in the Philippines